A centurion (. ; , or ) was a position in the Roman army during classical antiquity, nominally the commander of a century, a military unit originally consisting of 100  legionaries. The size of the century changed over time, and from the first century BC through most of the imperial era was reduced to 80 men.

In a Roman legion, centuries were grouped into cohorts and commanded by their senior-most centurion. The prestigious first cohort was led by the primus pilus, the most senior centurion in the legion and its fourth-in-command who was next in line for promotion to Praefectus Castrorum, and the primi ordines who were the centurions of the first cohort.

A centurion's symbol of office was the vine staff, with which they disciplined even Roman citizens, who were otherwise legally protected from corporal punishment by the Porcian Laws. Centurions also served in the Roman navy. After the 107 BC Marian reforms of Gaius Marius, centurions were professional officers. In Late Antiquity and the Middle Ages, the Byzantine army's centurions were also known by the name kentarch (Kentarches).

Role

In the Roman infantry, the centurions commanded a centuria or "century". During the Mid-Republic these centuries were grouped in pairs to make up a maniple, each century consisting of 30–60 men. After the Marian reforms a century typically composed of around 80 men, with six such centuries forming a legionary cohort. Later, generals and emperors further manipulated these numbers with double and half-strength units. Julius Caesar, for instance, made the first cohort of five double strength centuries.

Centurions received a much higher rate of pay than the average legionary. Veteran legionaries often worked as tenants of their former centurions.

During the Imperial era, centurions gradually rose in seniority in their cohort, commanding centuries with higher precedence, until commanding the senior century and therefore the whole cohort. The best centurions were then promoted to the first cohort and known as the Primi Ordines, commanding one of the cohort's five centuries and also taking on a staff role. The most senior centurion of the legion was the Primus Pilus who commanded the first century of the first cohort. All centurions, however senior, had their own allocated century. There was little difference between the ranks of centurions except for the Primus Pilus, who also participated in war councils. The Primus Pilus was so called because his own century was the first file of the first (rightmost) cohort. Only eight officers in a fully officered legion outranked the Primus Pilus: the legate (legatus legionis), commanding the legion; the senior tribune (tribunus laticlavius), second-in-command of the legion; the Camp Prefect (praefectus castrorum); and the five other tribunes (tribuni angusticlavii) who served as senior staff officers to the legate.

Centurions could be elected, appointed by the Senate, or promoted from the ranks for a variety of reasons. Julius Caesar is said to have promoted his centurions for displays of valour. Historians cite examples of them being the first over the enemy's wall or through the breach. The various centurion grades may be loosely compared to modern junior and middle officer grades. Below the centurions were the optiones, seconds-in-command of centuries.

Centurions were held personally responsible for the training and discipline of the legionaries under their command, and they had a reputation for dealing out harsh punishment. Tacitus tells a story in The Annals of a centurion known as "Cedo Alteram", which roughly translates to "Fetch Me Another". "The mutinous soldiers thrust out the tribunes and the camp-prefect; they plundered the baggage of the fugitives, and then killed a centurion, Lucilius, to whom, with soldier's humour, they had given the nickname 'Cedo Alteram', because when he had broken one vine-stick across a soldier's back, he would call in a loud voice for another… and another...and another!" The vine-stick (vitis) was a symbol of the centurion's authority and the implement with which he meted out punishment.

Unlike legionaries, centurions carried their swords on their left side as a sign of distinction and carried the pugio (dagger) on the right, as the sidearm.

Centurions wore transverse crests on their helmets that would distinguish them from other legionaries.

Centurions often had important social status and held powerful positions in society. They seem to have received their status according to their rank. On retirement, they could be eligible for employment as lictors.

Seniority

Each century had a precedence within the cohort. Centurions' seniority within the cohort and legion depended on the position within the legion of the century they were in charge of, which often took their name from their centurion. Centurions began by leading junior centuries before being promoted to leading a more senior one. Promotion usually came with experience, or at least length of service, but many still never made it as far as leading a 1st cohort. Yet for centurions who showed, say, particularly conspicuous bravery during battle, there was the opportunity to be promoted several grades at once. For example, Julius Caesar's reward for a centurion who had greatly pleased him was to advance him eight grades.

Promotion through the various grades often meant transferring to another legion.

The precedence during the times of the Republican manipular legion had each centurio command a centuria of sixty men within a manipulus (maniple) of two centuriae which was commanded by the senior centurio. Their order in decreasing seniority but opposite battle order;

Of the centuriae of a manipulus of Triarii;

Pilus Prior
Pilus Posterior

Of the centuriae of a manipulus of Principes;

Princeps Prior
Princeps Posterior

Of the centuriae of a manipulus of Hastati;

Hastatus Prior
Hastatus Posterior

For the Imperial and late Republican legion (post 107 BC) the first centuria of every cohors was its senior, with the first cohors following suit for the entire legion. There were five centuriae in the first cohors as opposed to the normal number of six, with each centuria having twice the number of legionaries of a normal centuria.

The six centuriae of a normal cohors, were, in order of decreasing seniority;

 The rear triarii (rear third line)
 The forward triarii (forward third line)
 The rear principes (rear principal line)
 The forward principes (forward principal line)
 The rear hastati (rear spears)
 The forward hastati (forward spears)

The titles of the centuriae and thus their respective centuriones are remnants from the manipular system of the Republic. In order of decreasing seniority;

1st Cohors, Centuriones known as the Primi Ordines

1st Centuria  Primus Pilus
2rd Centuria Princeps Prior
3rd Centuria Princeps Posterior
4th Centuria Hastatus Prior
5th Centuria Hastatus Posterior

2nd Cohors

1st Centuria Pilus Prior
2nd Centuria Pilus Posterior
3rd Centuria Princeps Prior
4th Centuria Princeps Posterior
5th Centuria Hastatus Prior
6th Centuria Hastatus Posterior

and so on.

Note that the Primi Ordines of the first cohors were senior to every centurio except for their Primus Pilus and the Pili Priori of the other first centuries.

Qualities
According to a fifth century text on the Roman military, a centurion was required to have numerous elite traits:

Centurions had to  be at least 30 years of age, literate (to read written orders), have letters of recommendation, and at least several years of military service. As a commander, a centurion had to be able to maintain his troops’ morale in peace and inspire his men in battle.

In the New Testament

Matthew's Gospel and Luke's Gospel relate an incident in which a servant of a centurion based in Capernaum was ill. In the Gospel of Luke, the centurion concerned had a good relationship with the elders of the local Jewish population and had funded the development of the synagogue in Capernaum, and when he heard that Jesus was in the locality, he asked the Jewish elders to request healing for his servant. In the Gospel of Matthew, the centurion makes direct contact with Jesus. The stories report that Jesus marveled at his faith and restored his servant to health. In both the Gospels of Mark and Matthew, the centurion who is present at the Crucifixion, said that Jesus was "God's Son". Accordingly, this centurion is considered by many to be the first Christian. In Luke's Gospel the centurion at the cross said that Jesus was "innocent".

The Book of Acts tells of a centurion named Cornelius whose righteous and generous acts find favor with God. The apostle Simon Peter is told in a vision to visit Cornelius, a Gentile, with whom association was not permitted under Jewish law. The encounter leads Simon Peter to understand that God accepts non-Jews who believe in God and repent. After this revelation, the message of Jesus was evangelized to the Gentiles.

See also

Historical centurions

 St Agathius
 St Alexander
 Aulus Pudens
 Cassius Chaerea
 St Cornelius
 Gaius Crastinus
 Gordius
 St Longinus
 Lucius Artorius Castus
 Lucius Vorenus
 St Marcellus
 Petronius
 Sempronius Densus
 Spurius Ligustinus
 Titus Pullo
 Verus

Related
 Primus pilus
 Vine staff
 List of Roman army unit types
 Military establishment of the Roman Empire
 Evocatus, related Roman rank
 Praefectus Castrorum

References

External links
 
 
 Ross Cowan, 'Centurion', Military Illustrated 271 (2010)
 Ross Cowan, Called to the Eagle: Some Sullan Centurions 

Ancient Roman titles
Military ranks of ancient Rome
New Testament Latin words and phrases
Combat occupations